Corey Hart may refer to:

 Corey Hart (singer) (born 1962), Canadian musician
 Corey Hart (album), a 1996 album
 Corey Hart (baseball) (born 1982), American baseball player

See also
 Carey Hart, American motocross rider

Hart, Corey